Senator Munson may refer to:

Dave Munson (born 1942), South Dakota State Senate
Donald F. Munson (born 1937), Maryland State Senate
Loveland Munson (1843–1921), Vermont State Senate
Oliver Munson (1856–1933), Wisconsin State Senate